The 1997–98 Ice Hockey Superleague season was the second season of the Ice Hockey Superleague (ISL).

There were no changes in the teams taking part during the season – Ayr Scottish Eagles, Basingstoke Bison, Bracknell Bees, Cardiff Devils, Manchester Storm, Newcastle Cobras, Nottingham Panthers and Sheffield Steelers.

The league season was reduced to twenty-eight rounds in the hope of organising a European tournament. However, this failed to materialise so the league arranged a new cup competition to meet the shortfall in fixtures. With the sponsorship of the Daily Express newspaper the Express Cup was launched.

Ayr Scottish Eagles won a Grand Slam of all available trophies.

Benson & Hedges Cup
The Benson & Hedges Cup consisted of the teams from the ISL and the top teams from the British National League. In the 1997–98 season, twelve teams in total were split into two regional groups playing each team in their group once at home and once away. The top four teams of each group then progressed to the quarter finals where the teams were paired off and the winning team on aggregate (after playing home and away) progressed to the semi finals. Again the winning team on aggregate progressed to the one-off final game held at Sheffield Arena.

Group A

Group B

Quarter-finals
Quarter-final A: Winner A (Manchester) vs 4th place B (Bracknell)
Bracknell Bees 2–2 Manchester Storm
Manchester Storm 5–4 Bracknell Bees (Manchester win 7–6 on aggregate)

Quarter-final B: 3rd place A (Ayr) vs 2nd place B (Nottingham)
Ayr Scottish Eagles 4–2 Nottingham Panthers
Nottingham Panthers 3–4 Ayr Scottish Eagles (Ayr win 8–6 on aggregate)

Quarter-final C: 2nd place A (Newcastle) vs 3rd place B (Basingstoke)
Newcastle Cobras 1–1 Basingstoke Bison
Basingstoke Bison 1–5 Newcastle Cobras (Newcastle win 6–2 on aggregate)

Quarter-final D: 4th place A (Sheffield) vs Winner B (Cardiff)
Sheffield Steelers 2–3 Cardiff Devils
Cardiff Devils 5–2 Sheffield Steelers (Cardiff win 8–4 on aggregate)

Semi-finals
Winner QF A (Manchester) vs Winner QF B (Ayr)
Manchester Storm 4–4 Ayr Scottish Eagles
Ayr Scottish Eagles 4–2 Manchester Storm (Ayr win 8–6 on aggregate)

Winner QF C (Newcastle) vs Winner QF D (Cardiff)
Cardiff Devils 6–2 Newcastle Cobras
Newcastle Cobras 3–2 Cardiff Devils (Cardiff win 8–5 on aggregate)

Final
The final took place at Sheffield Arena between Ayr Scottish Eagles and Cardiff Devils.

Ayr Scottish Eagles 2–1 Cardiff Devils

Express Cup
All eight teams in the league competed in the new competition for the Express Cup. The first round was a round-robin league with each team playing their opponents once at home and once away. The top four teams progressed to the semi finals. The semi finals were home and away games with the winner on aggregate progressing to the one off final game.

First round

Semi-finals
1st place (Ayr) vs 4th place (Sheffield)
Nottingham Panthers 4–4 Ayr Scottish Eagles
Ayr Scottish Eagles 12–4 Nottingham Panthers (Ayr win 16–8 on aggregate)

2nd place (Sheffield) vs 3rd place (Bracknell)
Bracknell Bees 3–1 Sheffield Steelers
Sheffield Steelers 4–4 Bracknell Bees (Bracknell win 7–4 on aggregate)

Final
Winner A vs Winner B
Ayr Scottish Eagles 3–2 Bracknell Bees

League
Each team played two home games and two away games against each of their opponents. All eight teams were entered into the playoffs.

Playoffs
All eight teams in the league took part in the playoffs. Group A consisted of Ayr, Newcastle, Nottingham and Sheffield while Group B consisted of Basingstoke, Bracknell, Cardiff and Manchester. The top two teams from each playoff group qualified for the semi finals, which was a home and away series with the winners on games progressing to the final and the losers progressing to the third place playoff.

Group A

Group B

Semi-finals
Winner B vs Runner-Up A
Cardiff Devils 5-4 Sheffield Steelers
Sheffield Steelers 2–6 Cardiff Devils (Cardiff win series 2–0)

Winner A vs Runner-Up B
Ayr Scottish Eagles 5–3 Manchester Storm
Manchester Storm 2-7 Ayr Scottish Eagles (Ayr win series 2–0)

Third place playoff
Loser A vs Loser B
Sheffield Steelers 5–2 Manchester Storm

Final
Winner A vs Winner B
Cardiff Devils 2-3 Ayr Scottish Eagles (after overtime)

Awards
Coach of the Year Trophy – Jim Lynch, Ayr Scottish Eagles
Player of the Year Trophy – Rob Dopson, Ayr Scottish Eagles
Alan Weeks Trophy – Stephen Cooper, Manchester Storm

All Star teams

Scoring leaders
The scoring leaders are taken from all league and Express Cup games.

Most points: 58 Tony Hand (Sheffield Steelers) and Mark Montanari (Ayr Scottish Eagles)
Most goals: 29 Jamie Steer (Ayr Scottish Eagles)
Most assists: 44 Tony Hand (Sheffield Steelers)
Most PIMs: 224 Rob Trumbley (Newcastle Cobras)

Footnotes

References
Ice Hockey Journalists UK
The Internet Hockey Database
Malcolm Preen's Ice Hockey Results and Tables

Ice Hockey Superleague seasons
1
United